Marchenkovka is a rural locality (a selo) in Maryevskoye Rural Settlement, Olkhovatsky District, Voronezh Oblast, Russia. The population was 638 as of 2010. There are 5 streets.

Geography 
Marchenkovka is located 8 km west of Olkhovatka (the district's administrative centre) by road. Zagiryanka is the nearest rural locality.

References 

Rural localities in Olkhovatsky District